Frankie Archuleta (born November 26, 1975) is a retired professional boxer who fought in the featherweight division.

Regional titles
Archuleta held the WBA-NABA super bantamweight title.

Archuleta lost in an attempt for the WBC Continental Americas super bantamweight title.

Archuleta fought to a draw and thus failed in his attempt to win the North American Boxing Federation featherweight title.

Notable opponents
Archuleta faced, and lost to, John Molina, Jr., Rocky Juarez, and Daud Yordan.  Archuleta also split a pair of fights against Johnny Tapia.

References

External links
 

Featherweight boxers
Living people
1975 births
American male boxers